Nádia Campeão (born 27 February 1958) is a Brazilian engineer and politician, member of the Communist Party of Brazil (PCdoB). She was Vice Mayor of São Paulo from 2013 to 2017, the second woman to assume this office.

Biography
Graduated in agronomic engineering for the ESALQ-USP, Nádia joined the Communist Party of Brazil in 1978.

In 2001, was nominated Secretary of Sports of São Paulo by then Mayor Marta Suplicy. In 2002, along with Marta, the then Secretary of Sports of the State Lars Grael, and the Governor of São Paulo Geraldo Alckmin, officialized the candidacy of São Paulo for the 2012 Summer Olympics.

In 2006, Nádia ran for Vice Governor of São Paulo along with Aloizio Mercadante. Mercadante was defeated in the first round by José Serra of the Brazilian Social Democracy Party (PSDB). In 2012, was elected Vice Mayor with Fernando Haddad of the Workers' Party (PT).

In the next year, Campeão assumed the presidency of the organizer committee that defended São Paulo candidacy as host of Expo 2020.

References

External links
 

|-

|-

1958 births
Living people
Communist Party of Brazil politicians
University of São Paulo alumni
Brazilian engineers